Philippe Desrosiers (born August 16, 1995) is a Canadian professional ice hockey goaltender. He is currently playing with the  Laval Rocket of the American Hockey League (AHL). Desrosiers was selected by the Dallas Stars in the second round (54th overall) of the 2013 NHL Entry Draft.

Playing career
Desrosiers played with the Rimouski Océanic of the Quebec Major Junior Hockey League (QMJHL) from 2012 to 2015. Following his first full season with Rimouski Océanic he was awarded the Raymond Lagacé Trophy as the QMJHL Defensive Rookie of the Year and was also named to the 2012–13 QMJHL All-Rookie Team. On April 19, 2014, the Dallas Stars of the National Hockey League signed Desrosiers to three-year entry-level contract, but he was returned to the Rimouski Océanic for the 2014–15 QMJHL season where, in his final year of major junior hockey, he was recognized for his outstanding play when he posted the QMJHL Best GAA of 2.50 to win the Jacques Plante Memorial Trophy and was selected as the 2014–15 CHL Goaltender of the Year.

After four seasons within the Stars organization, Desrosiers was not tendered a qualifying offer and was released as a free agent on June 25, 2019. He was signed to a one-year, two-way contract with the Florida Panthers on July 2, 2019. He was assigned to AHL affiliate, the Springfield Thunderbirds for the  season, appearing in 29 regular season games and posting a 16-10-2 record, before signing a one-year contract extension with the Panthers on October 15, 2020.

In the following pandemic delayed  season, Desrosiers spent the entirety of the year on the Panthers extended taxi squad, without featuring in a game.

As a free agent from the Panthers, Desrosiers opted to continue his career in the AHL by agreeing to a one-year contract with the Manitoba Moose, the primary affiliate to the Winnipeg Jets, on August 17, 2021. On March 19, 2022, Desrosiers signed a one year, two-way contract with the Winnipeg Jets.

Having concluded his contract with the Jets, Desrosiers continued his career in the AHL by signing a one-year deal with the Laval Rocket, affiliate to the Montreal Canadiens, on July 17, 2022.

Career statistics

Regular season and playoffs

International

Awards and honours

References

External links

1995 births
Living people
Canadian ice hockey goaltenders
Dallas Stars draft picks
Ice hockey people from Quebec
Idaho Steelheads (ECHL) players
Manitoba Moose players
Norfolk Admirals (ECHL) players
Sportspeople from Saint-Hyacinthe
Springfield Thunderbirds players
Rimouski Océanic players
Texas Stars players
Trois-Rivières Lions players